Darreh Ranj (also Romanized as Dareh Ranj) is a village in the Darreh Doran Rural District, in the Central District of Rafsanjan County, Kerman Province, Iran. At the 2006 census, its population was 24, in 9 families.

References 

Populated places in Rafsanjan County